Pacific Park Plaza is a 30-story residential building located in Emeryville, California adjacent to Interstate 80.

Pacific Park Plaza was completed in 1984. Its response to the 1989 Loma Prieta earthquake has been extensively studied due to its instrumentation.

The building's 580 apartments are a mix of one-bedroom and two-bedroom apartments. Residents and homeowners can join the Pacific Park Plaza Homeowners Association. Residents have included Dave Stewart of the Oakland Athletics.

References

Buildings and structures in Emeryville, California
Skyscrapers in California
Residential skyscrapers in California
Residential buildings completed in 1984